This is a list of what are intended to be the notable top hotels by country, five or four star hotels, notable skyscraper landmarks or historic hotels which are covered in multiple reliable publications. It should not be a directory of every hotel in every country:

Taiwan

Thailand

Ambassador City Jomtien
Cape Panwa Hotel
Conrad Bangkok
The Railway Hotel
Royal Cliff Hotels Group

Bangkok

Baiyoke Tower II
Centara Grand and Bangkok Convention Centre
Mandarin Oriental, Bangkok
The Peninsula Bangkok
Sofitel Centara Grand Hotel
Swissôtel Nai Lert Park Hotel

Togo
2 Fevrier Sofitel Hotel, Lomé

Turkey

 Çırağan Palace, Istanbul
 Concorde De Luxe Resort, Antalya
 Hilton Istanbul Bosphorus, Istanbul
 Hilton Izmir, İzmir
 Hotel Yeşil Ev, Istanbul
 Mardan Palace, Antalya
 Pera Palace Hotel, Istanbul
 Sheraton Ankara, Ankara
 Soğukçeşme Sokağı, Istanbul
 Sultanahmet Jail, Istanbul
 Tokatlıyan Hotels, Istanbul

Tuvalu
Vaiaku Lagi Hotel, Funafuti

References

T